This is a list of fictional fantasy worlds and lands. The best-known lands or worlds, not necessarily the most encompassing, are listed. For example, Middle-earth is only a region of Arda in J. R. R. Tolkien's fictional universe, but it is far better known.

Media key:
Listed in the table in chronological order.
A: anime and manga
C: comics and graphic novels
F: films
G: tabletop games
N: novels and short stories
O: other
P: plays
R: radio
T: television
V: video games

Novels and short stories

Alagaësia – a continent in Christopher Paolini's The Inheritance Cycle and in The Fork, the Witch, and the Worm (Tales from Alagaësia)
Bas-Lag – China Miéville novels
Corona – R.A. Salvatore (The DemonWars Saga and The Highwayman)
Emelan – Tamora Pierce novels
Green–sky – Zilpha Keatley Snyder novels
Krynn – Margaret Weis, Tracy Hickman, and numerous others – Dragonlance novels
Malazan World – Steven Erikson's Malazan Books of the Fallen novels
Rokugan – Legend of the Five Rings
Sartorias-deles – Sherwood Smith novels
Tortall – Tamora Pierce novels
Zothique – Clark Ashton Smith stories

Comics and graphic novels
The Homelands - Fables
World of Two Moons – Elfquest comics

Table-top gaming
Exandria – setting for the Dungeons & Dragons games played on the web series Critical Role
Krynn – Dragonlance games and novels, Dungeons & Dragons RPG
Kulthea (Shadow World) – Rolemaster RPG
Magnamund – Lone Wolf gamebooks and d20 system
Mystara – Dungeons & Dragons RPG
Rifts – Rifts - Role playing game by Kevin Siembieda
Titan – Fighting Fantasy gamebooks and RPG
Uresia – Big Eyes, Small Mouth and d20 system RPGs
World of Darkness from the series of tabletop role-playing games of the same name
Yrth – GURPS setting

See also
Imaginary world
Simulated reality
Planets in science fiction
List of fictional shared universes in film and television

References

Worlds
 
Worlds